Al Kamil Wal Wafi is a Wilayat of Ash Sharqiyah South in the Sultanate of Oman.

Population

References 

Populated places in Oman